Alex Scholpp is a German guitarist born in Stuttgart, who is known above all for his activity in the band Farmer Boys and Tarja Turunen. He also composes/plays for the bands Tieflader and Sinner. He is also a session guitar player and teaches the guitar in his own music school "Alex Scholpp's Guitar Camp" in Stuttgart.

In the middle of the 90s he was a founding Member of the band Farmer Boys, releasing 4 albums and touring Europe and is recording for various projects of mixed styles in the studio. 2003 he is founding his music- school "Alex Scholpp's Guitar- Camp" in Stuttgart. After more session guitar work (among others "Die Fantastischen Vier") Alex Scholpp is working since 2007 with Tarja Turunen (ex- Nightwish), playing live and recording on all her studio albums. Besides that he has his Metal- Band "Tieflader" and is playing for the German Hard Rock Band "Sinner" and had a project called "The Help" together with Flo Dauner and Doug Wimbish. He worked as author for the German "guitar" magazine for two special issues "School of Metal".

Since 1999 Alex is playing exclusively ESP Guitars, his model being custom variations of the M II- model. He is also an endorser of Blackstar amps using mainly the "Artisan" and "Series One" Amps. For both Brands he is playing clinics and is recording demo- videos.

External links
 http://www.tarjaturunen.com
 http://www.guitar-camp.de
 http://www.ppvmedien.de/guitar-deluxe-1-schoeol-of-metal-III
 http://www.ppvmedien.de/guitar-deluxe-2-schoeol-of-metal-IV
Dacia & The WMD 
Tieflader
Farmer Boys
Interview with Alex for Tarja Fanclub
Interview with Alex for Hellmagazine

German rock guitarists
German male guitarists
Living people
Musicians from Stuttgart
Sinner (band) members
Year of birth missing (living people)